Herbert Swann (28 March 1882 – 5 September 1954) was an English professional footballer who played in the Football League for Bury between 1903 and 1906. A centre forward, he then spent the 1906–07 season playing in the Southern League and the Western League for Plymouth Argyle. On 31 October 1906, Swann scored all five goals in a 5–0 Western League victory over Millwall. He is the great-great-grandfather of YouTuber Thogden (real name Theo Ogden), and great-grandfather of YouTuber Thogdad (real name Stephen Ogden) He had 3 children Leonard (1909-1988), Catherine (1913-1966) and Joan (1924-2022) and married twice with Miah Fish (1885-1916) and Kate Orpheus Whittaker (1891-1982).His parents were John Swann (1837-1920) and Jane Cooban Rawlinson (1839-1891)

He later played for Crystal Palace and Tottenham Hotspur.

References

1882 births
1954 deaths
People from Lytham St Annes
English footballers
Association football forwards
Bury F.C. players
Plymouth Argyle F.C. players
Crystal Palace F.C. players
Tottenham Hotspur F.C. players
English Football League players
Southern Football League players